Frohmund Burger (born 11 June 1946) is a Venezuelan sailor. He competed in the Dragon event at the 1968 Summer Olympics.

References

External links
 

1946 births
Living people
Venezuelan male sailors (sport)
Olympic sailors of Venezuela
Sailors at the 1968 Summer Olympics – Dragon
Sportspeople from Klagenfurt